Karine Berger (born 11 March 1973) is a French politician, member of the French National Assembly representing Hautes-Alpes between 2012 and 2017. She was the national secretary for the economy of the French Socialist Party.

Political career 
Berger won her seat at the 2012 parliamentary election.

In 2017 she lost her seat by a landslide, coming in fifth place in the first round. Her seat was won by En Marche candidate Pascale Boyer.

References

External links
 Official website
 

Living people
1973 births
Lycée Louis-le-Grand alumni
École Polytechnique alumni
Sciences Po alumni
Socialist Party (France) politicians
People from Limoges
21st-century French women politicians
Women members of the National Assembly (France)
Deputies of the 14th National Assembly of the French Fifth Republic